Destiny is the ninth studio album by English heavy metal band Saxon, released in March 1988. It is also the only studio album to feature the rhythm section of drummer Nigel Durham and bassist Paul Johnson (former Heritage, later in U.S.I. and Demon) on it.

The album was produced by Stephan Galfas (Stryper, Cher, Savatage) and the last studio album Saxon recorded for EMI who dropped the band when the album sales were disappointing. During the tour for this album, Durham and Johnson were sacked and replaced in 1988 by bassist Nibbs Carter and a returning Nigel Glockler on drums who finished the tour.

The album has been remastered and repackaged several times with various bonuses such as a 12" mix of the single "I Can’t Wait Anymore" plus live B-Sides "Broken Heroes" and "Gonna Shout", both recorded live in Madrid, a live take of "Rock the Nations" recorded at the Hammersmith Odeon, which originally appeared as the B-side to "Ride Like the Wind", and some alternative monitor mixes.

Track listing

Personnel
Biff Byford – vocals
Graham Oliver – guitar
Paul Quinn – guitar
Paul Johnson – bass guitar
Nigel Durham – drums

 Additional musicians
 Stephen Laws Clifford – keyboards
 Dave Taggart, George Lamb, Phil Caffrey, Steve Mann – backing vocals

 Production
 Stephan Galfas – producer, mixing, arrangements
 Ian Taylor – mixing
 Spencer Henderson – engineer
 James Allen-Jones – engineer
 Hook and Manor, Berkshire, UK – recording location
 Swanyard Studios, London – mixing location
 Sterling Sound, New York – mastering location

Charts

Album

Singles

References

Saxon (band) albums
1988 albums
EMI Records albums